Alberto Bragaglia (January 26, 1896 - April 30, 1985) was an Italian Futurist painter.

Further reading

References

1896 births
1985 deaths
People from Frosinone
20th-century Italian painters